Carex obnupta is a species of sedge known by the common name slough sedge. It is native to western North America from British Columbia to California where it grows abundantly in wet, often saline habitat such as wetlands. The plant produces upright, angled stems approaching 1.2 meters in maximum height, growing in beds or colonies from rhizome networks. The inflorescence is a cluster of flower spikes accompanied by a long leaflike bract. The pistillate spikes and sometimes the staminate spikes dangle on peduncles. The fruit is coated by a hard, tough, shiny perigynium which is generally dark in color.

References

 C.Michael Hogan ed. 2010. Carex obnupta. Encyclopedia of Life
Jepson Manual Treatment

External links
USDA Plants Profile
Flora of North America
Washington Native Plants Photo Handout
Photo gallery

obnupta
Plants described in 1891
Taxa named by Liberty Hyde Bailey
Flora of British Columbia
Flora of California
Flora of Oregon
Flora of Washington (state)